Hatikva Quarter (Shkhunat Hatikva) is a working class neighbourhood in southeastern Tel Aviv, Israel.

History
The quarter was founded in 1935, named for "Mount Hope" ("Har HaTikva" in Hebrew), a farm built in 1853 by Protestant Prussian and American Protestants and abandoned. Johann Steinbeck was the grandfather of John Steinbeck and abandoned the colony in 1858 after Arab attackers killed his brother and raped his brother's wife and mother-in-law. It became part of the Tel Aviv municipal area after the 1948 Arab–Israeli War.

Bnei Yehuda Tel Aviv football club played at the Hatikva Neighborhood Stadium until moving to Bloomfield Stadium. The headquarters of the Israeli Labor Party is located there.

The Shevah Mofet school is located on the site of the Steinbeck farm house.

Notable residents
Ofra Haza (1957–2000), singer and actress
Tomer Kapon (born 1985), film and television actor
Goel Ratzon (born 1950)

See also
Neighborhoods of Tel Aviv

References

American diaspora in Israel
German diaspora in Israel
Mizrahi dominated places
Working class in Asia